The 1905–06 Scottish Cup was the 33rd season of Scotland's most prestigious football knockout competition. The Cup was won by Heart of Midlothian when they beat Third Lanark 1–0.

Calendar

First round

Second round

Second round replay

Second round second replay

Second round third replay

Quarter-final

Quarter-final replay

Semi-finals

Replay

Second replay

Final

See also
1905–06 in Scottish football

References

RSSF Scottish Cup 05-06

1905-06
Cup
1905–06 domestic association football cups